In Greek mythology, Periopis (Ancient Greek: Περιώπιδος) was a princess of Pherae as daughter of King of Pheres and possibly, Periclymene, daughter of King Minyas of Orchomenus. She was the possible sister of Admetus, Lycurgus, Eidomene, and Antigona. Periopis was the mother of Patroclus by Menoetius. Otherwise, the hero's mother was called Damocrateia, Sthenele, Polymele or Philomela.

Notes

References 

 Apollodorus, The Library with an English Translation by Sir James George Frazer, F.B.A., F.R.S. in 2 Volumes, Cambridge, MA, Harvard University Press; London, William Heinemann Ltd. 1921. . Online version at the Perseus Digital Library. Greek text available from the same website.
Gaius Julius Hyginus, Fabulae from The Myths of Hyginus translated and edited by Mary Grant. University of Kansas Publications in Humanistic Studies. Online version at the Topos Text Project.
 Tzetzes, John, Allegories of the Iliad translated by Goldwyn, Adam J. and Kokkini, Dimitra. Dumbarton Oaks Medieval Library, Harvard University Press, 2015. 

Women in Greek mythology
Thessalian characters in Greek mythology
Locrian mythology